The Taichang Emperor (28 August 1582 – 26 September 1620), personal name Zhu Changluo, was the 15th Emperor of the Ming dynasty. He was the eldest son of the Wanli Emperor and succeeded his father as emperor in 1620. However, his reign came to an abrupt end less than one month after his coronation when he was found dead one morning in the palace following a bout of diarrhea. He was succeeded by his son, Zhu Youjiao, who was enthroned as the Tianqi Emperor. His era name, "Taichang", means "grand prosperity." His reign was the shortest in Ming history.

Early life
Zhu Changluo was born in 1582, the 10th year of the Wanli era, to the Wanli Emperor and a palace attendant, Lady Wang, who served under the Emperor's mother, Empress Dowager Xiaoding. After it was discovered that Lady Wang was pregnant, the Emperor was persuaded by his mother to make her a concubine and awarded her the title "Consort Gong of the Second Grade" (恭妃). However she was never one of the Wanli Emperor's favourite consorts. After his birth, Zhu Changluo was largely ignored by his father even though he, as the firstborn son of the emperor, was by default the heir apparent (crown prince) according to the Ming dynasty's traditional rules of succession. He was born shortly after his elder sister, the Princess Rongchang; the Wanli Emperor's eldest child and only child with his primary wife Empress Xiaoduanxian.

Zhu Changluo spent most of his life as a hapless pawn in a power struggle for the title of crown prince. The Wanli Emperor openly preferred naming Zhu Changxun, his younger son born to his favourite consort Noble Consort Zheng as crown prince over the seniority of Zhu Changluo, but his intention was met with vehement opposition by most of his Confucian-educated ministers who insisted that the Emperor adhered to dynastic traditions. Frustrated by the multiple petitions to install Zhu Changluo as crown prince, the Wanli Emperor decided to stonewall the issue and left the question of his designated heir in suspense. Some historians have suggested that the impasse on the selection of crown prince was part of the cause of the Wanli Emperor's withdrawal from daily government administration.

Caught in this political limbo, Zhu Changluo was deliberately not assigned a regular tutor or given any systematic Confucian education even after he started school at the age of 13, an unusually late age for Ming princes to begin their education. In 1601, the Wanli Emperor gave in to pressure from his ministers and more importantly from the empress dowager and a 19-year-old Zhu Changluo was formally instated as crown prince and heir apparent. However this formal recognition did not signal the end of court intrigues. Rumours of the Wanli Emperor's intention to replace Zhu Changluo with Zhu Changxun continued to surface through the years,

In 1615, the Ming imperial court was hit by a mysterious scandal. A man called Zhang Chai, armed only with a wooden staff, managed to drive away the eunuchs guarding the palace gates and break into Ciqing Palace—then the crown prince's living quarters. Zhang Chai was eventually subdued and thrown in prison. Although initial investigations found him to be a lunatic, upon further investigations by a magistrate named Wang Zhicai, Zhang Chai confessed to being party to a plot instigated by two eunuchs working under Noble Consort Zheng. According to Zhang Chai's confession, the two eunuchs had promised him rewards for assaulting the crown prince, thus indirectly implicating Lady Zheng in an assassination plot. Presented with incriminating evidence and the gravity of the accusations, the Wanli Emperor, in an attempt to spare Lady Zheng, personally presided over the case and laid full blame on the two eunuchs, who were executed along with Zhang Chai. Although the case was quickly hushed up, it did not squelch public discussions and eventually became known as the "Case of the Wooden Staff Assault" (梃擊案), one of three notorious mysteries of the late Ming dynasty.

In 1615, the crown prince became infuriated with his concubine, Lady Liu, who was the mother of the future Chongzhen Emperor. He ordered her punished, during which ordeal Lady Liu died. It is debated whether the crown prince ordered her to be killed or if her death was an accident. Fearing that this incident would further turn his father against him and towards Zhu Changxun, the crown prince had Lady Liu secretly buried in the Western Hills near Beijing and forbade palace staff from mentioning the affair. On his ascension to the throne, the Chongzhen Emperor had Lady Liu reburied in the Ming tombs next to her husband.

Reign
The Wanli Emperor died on 18 August 1620 and was succeeded by Zhu Changluo on 28 August 1620, the latter's 38th birthday by Western calculation. Upon his coronation, Zhu Changluo adopted the era name "Taichang" (literally "grand prosperity") for his reign, hence he is known as the Taichang Emperor.

The first few days of his reign started promisingly enough as recorded in the Ming histories. Two million taels of silver was entailed as a gift to the troops guarding the border, important bureaucratic posts left vacant during the Wanli Emperor's long periods of administrative inactivity were finally starting to be filled, and many of the deeply unpopular extraordinary taxes and duties imposed by the Wanli Emperor were also revoked at this time. However, ten days after his coronation, the Taichang Emperor became so ill that celebrations for his birthday (by Chinese calculation) were cancelled.

According to non-official primary sources, the Taichang Emperor's illness was brought about by excessive sexual indulgence after he was presented with eight maidens by Lady Zheng. The emperor's already serious condition was further compounded by severe diarrhoea after taking a dose of laxative, recommended by an attending eunuch Cui Wensheng on 10 September. Finally on 25 September, to counter the effects of the laxative, he asked for and took a red pill presented by a minor court official named Li Kezhuo, who dabbled in apothecary.

It was recorded in official Ming histories that the Taichang Emperor felt much better after taking the red pill, regained his appetite and repeatedly praised Li Kezhuo as a "loyal subject". That same afternoon, the emperor took a second pill and was found dead the next morning on 26 September 1620.

The death of an emperor who was seemingly in good health within the span of a month sent shock waves through the Ming Empire and rumours started spreading. The much talked about mystery surrounding the Taichang Emperor's death became known as the infamous "Case of the Red Pills" (红丸案), one of three notorious 'mysteries' of the late Ming dynasty. Consort Kang of the Li Clan was also involved in this matter. The fate of Li Kezhuo, whose pills were at the center of this controversy, became a hotly contested subject between competing power factions of officials and eunuchs vying for influence at the Ming imperial court. Opinions ranged from awarding him money for the emperor's initial recovery to executing his entire family for murdering the emperor. The question was finally settled in 1625 when Li Kezhuo was exiled to the border regions on the order of the powerful eunuch Wei Zhongxian, signalling the total dominance of eunuchs during the reign of the Taichang Emperor's son, the Tianqi Emperor.

Legacy
The Taichang Emperor's unexpected death threw the Ming imperial court into some logistical disarray. Firstly, the court was still officially in mourning over the death of the Wanli Emperor, whose corpse at this point was still lying in state waiting for an auspicious date to be interred. Secondly, all imperial tombs were custom made by the reigning emperor and there was no proper place to bury the Taichang Emperor, who had only just ascended the throne. A tomb was hastily commissioned over the foundation of the demolished tomb of the Jingtai Emperor. The construction was finally completed on the eighth month of 1621 and consecrated Qingling (庆陵). Finally, on the question of naming the emperor's reign, although the emperor had taken the formal era name of "Taichang", it was sandwiched between the 48th year of the Wanli era (1620) and the first year of the Tianqi era (1621). After much discussion, the Ming imperial court accepted Zuo Guangdou's suggestion to designate the Wanli era as having ended in the seventh lunar month of 1620, while the Taichang era spanned from the 8th to 12th months in the same year. The Tianqi era officially started from the first lunar month of 1621.

Family
Consorts and Issue:
 Empress Xiaoyuanzhen, of the Guo clan (1580–1613)
 Princess Huaishu (1604–1610), personal name Huijian, second daughter
 Empress Dowager Xiaohe, of the Wang clan (1582–1619)
 Zhu Youjiao, the Tianqi Emperor (23 December 1605 – 30 September 1627), first son
 Zhu Youxue, Prince Huai of Jian (1607–1610), second son
 Empress Dowager Xiaochun, of the Liu clan (1588–1615)
 Zhu Youjian, the Chongzhen Emperor (6 February 1611 – 25 April 1644), fifth son
 Consort Gongyizhuang, of the Li clan (5 December 1588 – 6 December 1624)
 Consort Yi, of the Fu clan (1588–1644)
 Princess Ningde, personal name Huiyan, sixth daughter
 Married Liu Youfu in 1626
 Princess Suiping (1611 – 8 February 1633), personal name Huijing, seventh daughter
 Married Qi Zanyuan in 1627, and had issue (four daughters)
 Consort Kang, of the Li clan (1584–1674)
 Zhu Youmo, Prince Hui of Huai (30 November 1610 – 1615), fourth son
 Princess Le'an (1611–1643), personal name Huiti, ninth daughter
 Married Gong Yonggu (d. 1644), and had issue (three sons, two daughters)
 Zhu Huizhao, (1616–1617), tenth daughter
 Consort Yi, of the Ding clan
 Zhu Youxu, Prince Huai of Xiang, sixth son
 Consort Jing, of the Feng clan
 Zhu Youshan, Prince Zhao of Hui (b. 1620), seventh son
 Concubine Shen, of the Shao clan
 Princess Daowen (1621–1621), personal name Huizheng, 11th daughter
 Concubine Xiang, of the Zhang clan
 Concubine Ke, of the Li clan
 Concubine Ding, of the Guo clan
 Lady of Selected Service, of the Wang clan
 Zhu Youji, Prince Si of Qi (14 August 1609 – 1616), third son
 Lady of Selected Service, of the Zhao clan (d. 1620)
 Unknown
 Princess Daoyi, first daughter
 Zhu Huiheng (朱徽姮), third daughter
 Princess Daoshun (1606–1607), personal name Huixian, fourth daughter
 Zhu Huiweng, (1608–1609), fifth daughter
 Zhu Huiwan, eighth daughter

Ancestry

See also
 Chinese emperors family tree (late)
List of Emperors of the Ming dynasty

References

Further reading

1582 births
1620 deaths
17th-century Chinese monarchs
Ming dynasty emperors